St Georges is a suburb of Adelaide in the City of Burnside.  The suburb is mostly residential, consisting of upper-middle class residents.

References

Suburbs of Adelaide